The 2019–20 Texas A&M–Corpus Christi Islanders men's basketball team represented Texas A&M University–Corpus Christi in the 2019–20 NCAA Division I men's basketball season. The Islanders, led by ninth-year head coach Willis Wilson, played their home games at American Bank Center, with three games at the Dugan Wellness Center, both of which are in Corpus Christi, Texas, as members of the Southland Conference. They finished the season 14–18, 10–10 in Southland play to finish in a three-way tie for sixth place. They lost in the first round of the Southland tournament to Northwestern State.

Previous season
The Islanders finished the 2018–19 season 14–18 overall, 9–9 in Southland play to finish in sixth place. As the No. 6 seed in the Southland tournament, they were defeated in the first round by Central Arkansas.

Roster

Schedule and results

|-
!colspan=9 style=| Exhibition

|-
!colspan=9 style=| Regular season

|-
!colspan=9 style=| Southland tournament
|-

|-

Source

See also 
 2019–20 Texas A&M–Corpus Christi Islanders women's basketball team

References

Texas A&M–Corpus Christi Islanders men's basketball seasons
Texas AandM-Corpus Christi Islanders
Texas AandM-Corpus Christi Islanders men's basketball
Texas AandM-Corpus Christi Islanders men's basketball